Mount Askin is a high (c.  flat-topped mountain between Mount McClintock and Mount Aldrich on the main ridge of Britannia Range. Named by Advisory Committee on Antarctic Names (US-ACAN) after Rosemary A. Askin, geologist, Byrd Polar Research Center, Ohio State University, who, 1970–2000, worked in such diverse parts of Antarctica as Antarctic Peninsula, South Shetland Islands, Victoria Land and the Transantarctic Mountains, including the general vicinity of this mountain.

Mountains of Oates Land
Britannia Range (Antarctica)